Abel Henri Joseph Bergaigne (31 August 1838 – 6 August 1888) was a French Indologist and scholar of Sanskrit. He wrote a number of books related to religion and philosophy. He published the beginning of a study on grammatical construction, which is regarded for its historical development. Languages included Sanskrit, Greek, Latin, Germanic languages and others.

Biography
Born in Vimy, Pas-de-Calais, on 31 August 1838. After his father, he took a job in Registration service; however, his rising interest in literature and science led him to abandon the job.

In 1867, Bergaigne became a coach in Sanskrit. By 1877, he became a lecturer in Sorbonne, and in 1885, he was appointed as a professor of Sanskrit and comparative linguistic. Apart from Vedas, he had also translated Bhagavada Gita.

He died on 6 August 1888.

Legacy
His interpretation of Rigveda brought him worldwide fame. He was regarded as the leading Orientalist of France for his period. His work has influenced people such as Sylvain Lévi, Paul Mus, and others.

One review described his book La Religion Védique D'après Les Hymnes Du Rig-Veda as "an acute, careful, and comprehensive work by an able scholar."

Notable works
La Religion Védique D'après Les Hymnes Du Rig-Veda, 1878
Inscriptions sanscrites du Cambodge, 1882
La division en adhyayas du Rig-Veda, 1888

References 

1838 births
1888 deaths
People from Vimy
Academic staff of the University of Paris
French Indologists
Members of the Académie des Inscriptions et Belles-Lettres
Chevaliers of the Légion d'honneur